Ugia albilinea is a species of moth in the family Erebidae. It is found in Kenya.

References

Endemic moths of Kenya
Moths described in 1926
Ugia